The Fitzcarrald Isthmus is an 11 km long land bridge that connected important rubber trade routes of the Urubamba River and the Madre de Dios River in Peru.

Carlos Fermin Fitzcarrald came across the land bridge in 1893 after repeated attempts to unite trade in the North and South of the Amazon basin during the Amazon rubber boom. Based on suggestions of local indigenous rubber workers who were familiar with the area, he began an initial exploration, and subsequent clearing of the isthmus for trade. The isthmus is located between two small river arms, which are in turn tributaries of major river systems: the Serjhali river (a tributary of the Mishagua river, tributary of the Urumbamba River, itself tributary to the Amazon river) and the Caspajhali river (a tributary of the Manu river, itself a tributary of the Madre de Dios River).

Fitzcarrald decided to disassemble his steam boat Contamana and have it be carried across the isthmus – a publicity stunt that proved the isthmus a workable cargo route for rubber transport, and served nearly a century later as the visual inspiration for Werner Herzog's film Fitzcarraldo.

The land bridge has a slow upwards slope and features one 500-metre hill with a 74% gradient in its middle; mules were used to carry cargo across that inconvenient dirt road (a "trocha" in Spanish).

While others used and further mapped out the isthmus, Fitzcarrald died four years after he had discovered it; the rubber boom ended less than a decade later after the biotheft of Henry Wickham led to the complete collapse of the South American rubber economy. With rubber no longer needing to be shipped, the isthmus route grew over again and is invisible on satellite images as of 2019 – only the two rivers remain visually.

See also 
 Carlos Fitzcarrald
 Carlos Fermín Fitzcarrald Province
 Iquitos
 Natural rubber
 Puerto Maldonado

References 

Geography of Peru